Hybridisation in terns is not as frequent as in gulls; however, some mixed pairings have been noted.

Marsh terns

Hybridisation between white-winged black tern and black tern has been recorded from Sweden and the Netherlands. Two juvenile birds at Chew Valley Lake, England, in September 1978 and September 1981, were also believed to be hybrids; they showed mixed characters of the two species, specifically a combination of a dark mantle (a feature of white-winged black) with dark patches on the breast-side (a feature of black tern, not shown by white-winged black).

See also

 Hybridisation in gulls

References

Terns
Hybridisation in birds